Ascolepis may refer to:
 Ascolepis, a genus of corals in the family Acanthogorgiidae, synonym of Fannyella
 Ascolepis, a genus of plants in the family Cyperaceae, synonym of Cyperus